The .44 Henry, also known as the .44 Rimfire, the .44 Long Rimfire, or the 11x23mmR (11x23mm Rimmed) in Europe, is a rimfire rifle and handgun cartridge featuring a -long brass or copper case.

Background
The cartridge is named after the intended firearm of use, the Henry rifle, which is in turn named after Benjamin Tyler Henry, the 19th-century American gunsmith who invented both the cartridge and the rifle of that name. Henry designed both in his spare time while he was the foreman of the New Haven Arms Company, and was granted a US patent for his creations on October 16, 1860. While it was not the first repeating rifle, it was one of the first successful designs (alongside the Spencer rifle), and it provided the basis for the iconic Winchester rifle. Part of the Henry rifle's great success was due to the relatively novel self-contained metallic cartridge, which allowed a repeating mechanism to work. Other breechloaders of the time often relied on a simple, separate percussion cap for ignition, just like a typical muzzleloader of the era, and often used paper or linen cartridge cases, which provided no obturation, or sealing of the breech against the expanding gases (such as the Sharps rifle). Some utilized self-contained primers, but still lacked metallic cases (the Dreyse "needle gun"). While these one-shot breechloading weapons were great improvements over the muzzleloader, it required the adoption of the self-contained metallic case before repeaters could become viable weapons. The .44 Henry was an early self-contained metallic cartridge, and was one of the main reasons for the ultimate success of the Henry rifle.

Ballistics

The cartridge's original 200-grain bullet had a flat nose. A bullet with a more pointed nose was later used in order to decrease aerodynamic drag and increase range. Even so, it still achieved a ballistic coefficient of only 0.153, which reflects very poor long range capabilities; the .44 Henry is a large and slow bullet, giving poor external ballistics and a great deal of ballistic drop during its trajectory, making hitting a target past 200 yards almost impossible for the average shooter. Modern comparisons to the .44 Henry rifle's ballistics would include such large-bore handgun cartridges as the 200 gr .45 ACP, and 200 gr .44 Special. Due to the vast advances in propellant and metallurgy technology, these latter can nearly achieve the Henry Rifle's velocity from a handgun, and do not even require the long barrel of a rifle to give equivalent velocity. By modern standards, the resulting effective range for the .44 Henry fired from a rifle on military targets or small to medium game would be up to 200 yards. However, when it was introduced in 1860, standards such as "effective ranger by to ensure a humane kill and a hit in a vital area were far more lax, and most hunters were accustomed to hunting game at short ranges in any case. Such performance was not unusual or remarkable, and the idea of weapons capable of engaging a target at hundreds of yards was generally reserved for dedicated, long-barreled target rifles and trained shooters. The ability to fire 16 rounds before reloading made the Henry's lack of long range capability even less of an issue.

Use
The .44 Henry cartridge was used most notably in the Henry Model 1860 repeating rifle. This rifle was first used in the American Civil War, mainly by Union cavalry troops, although only in very limited numbers. It was also used by the very few Confederate troops who managed to capture one of these rifles along with a supply of ammunition, which was impossible to find in the Confederate south.

After the Civil War, the Henry cartridge was used in the Winchester Model 1866 rifles during the Russo-Turkish War (1877-1878) by the Turkish troops and in the Franco-Prussian War 1870/71 by the French.

In civilian models, Winchester Model 1866 rifles and carbines, Smith & Wesson No. 3 Revolvers, Colt Model 1860 Army long cylinder conversion and the Colt Model 1871-72 "Open Top" revolvers were available in .44 Henry. From 1875 until 1880, Colt produced Model 1873 Single Action Armys in .44 Henry to accommodate owners of Henry Model 1860 and Winchester Model 1866 rifles and carbines.

Later developments

The cartridge cases were originally made from copper, and later brass. The cartridge was still commercially made into the 1920s and 1930s.

The .44 Henry cartridge was perfected by George R. Stetson’s U.S. Patent 120403, assigned to the Winchester Repeating Arms Company on October 31, 1871. It has as its object the use of swaged and lubricated projectiles of greater perfection in shape.

See also
List of rimfire cartridges
List of handgun cartridges
List of rifle cartridges
Table of handgun and rifle cartridges

References

Pistol and rifle cartridges
Military cartridges
Rimfire cartridges
Winchester Repeating Arms Company cartridges